Lagostina is an Italian manufacturer of cookware, cutlery and other kitchenware. They are also an important manufacturer of pressure cookers. Lagostina was founded in 1901 in Omegna, Province of Verbania, Italy, as a family business initially focusing on stainless steel flatware.

History

1901–1930 : A region that drives men to surpass themselves 
Lagostina was born in Piedmont, Omegna. On the shores of Lake Orta, a region famous for handcrafted household goods production, the company was founded by Carlo Lagostina and his son Emilio.

The metalcrafters gradually settled in this country where the economy was based mainly on wood, and contributed to the beginnings of industrial progress. The distribution of electric power, the development of railway network and the presence of a skilled workforce heavily impulsed the industrial boom. 
 
Lagostina was created in 1901 and quickly became an expert in the manufacture of tinned iron flatware. In the early 1930s, the flatware production reached up to 30,000 pieces per day and included among its main customers the Navy, Army and Aeronautics.

1932–1956 : The beginnings of stainless steel 
Massimo Lagostina, grandnephew of the founder, launched the first stainless steel kitchen tools. This material, totally new for this purpose but already known for its aesthetic qualities and its robustness, enables Lagostina to express the Italian style art of living.

In 1929, at the Fair of Milan, Massimo saw the first stainless steel sheets. In the United States and Sweden, industrial production of this alloy began after a long period of studies and experiences. At that time the first products manufactured for the chemical and food industries were experimented. Massimo quickly understood that this material could also be used successfully in the field of kitchen tools. 
 
In Italy, the first collection of stainless steel kitchenware was created in 1934 by Lagostina : « Casa Mia ». The range bore the famous logo of "the little house with smoking chimney" and a met great success, immortalized in 1956 in an exhibition at the Museum of Modern Art in New York (MoMA).

At that time, selling steel pots and pans was not easy and Massimo faced the challenge to impose these new ranges. He made great efforts to make his new and much more expensive products accepted  on the market. The first customers were communities, hospitals, liners but also department stores such as La Rinascente in Milan. The first retailers were mainly located in the Piedmont and Lombardy.

Meanwhile, the rise of Lagostina continues through the manufacturing of technical parts for the aircraft industry until 1940. Indeed, demand for technical parts strongly increases during the War.

1957–1971: The success of stainless steel 
The years 1956–1957 showed the end of tinned iron production. It was a turning point for Lagostina: the manufacturing process went from manual era to more mechanized manufacturing.

The company established its own research and development laboratory in order to promote the development of innovative processes. 
The industrial boom inexorably went ahead in 1955 with the launch of the first thermodiffusion base: Thermoplan, which provides excellent heat conductivity across the bottom of the product. 1960 marks the birth of the Lagostina pressure cooker, with its system of closure and openness so characteristic : with a  lever and a flexible cover, the product is entirely made of stainless steel whereas in rest of Europe, this type of product is still made of aluminium.

Thus a new plant and new office were built with the help of the architect Carlo Mazzeri, who had already participated as a designer to create the Moon Line handles and the kettle with Thermoplan base. Coming years dedicated to export, to Canada and particularly to France where a sales subsidiary was founded in 1967. During those years, Lagostina kept on drawing attention by an innovative and humorous communication such as "The Line" (La Linea) created by Osvaldo Cavandoli. Lagostina became one of the first Italian companies to understand the importance of advertising.

Other famous designers helped the brand to establish its awareness and strong personality. Thus, Giorgetto Giugiaro designed the "Atmosphere" pressure cooker and the "Modia".

1972–2001: The establishment of a prestigious image dedicated to Culinary Art 
This last part of the 20th century was characterized by a process of diversification of ranges. Indeed, over the years, Lagostina had adapted its production to changing culinary methods and flavors: in the 1980s, a new function for the pressure cooker appears :the "steam cooking"; and the launch in 1986 of the "Pastaoila", a special pot to cook and drain pasta.

2005: A new approach based on the original culture of the brand 
Lagostina become a brand of Groupe SEB in 2004 and its positioning and identity are redefined in order to re-establish its high-end image.

In 2009, Lagostina works jointly with the famous Swiss photographer Steeve Iuncker in order to pay homage to Italian women who cook, from generation to generation, the best pasta in the world. Lagostina publishes the book « PASTA » : through a gallery of portraits, the reader gets to know Emanuela, Antonella, Lucia ... Modern Italian women who wished to share their culinary secrets under the lens of the photographer.

Products 
Lagostina produces premium cookware features such as stoves, pots, pans, cast iron pots and tableware (services, flatware...).

Although they are an Italian brand, their products are made in China, France and Italy (whenever the product is made in Italy or France it is advertised as such).

Innovations 
Among the last innovations of the brand, there is « Melodia Triply » and, most of all, the new pressure cookers Domina and Maga with new open-close patented system « Easy Opening ».

In 2009, Lagostina launches La Collezione Rossa, a worldwide innovation in the field of cookware. This collection is the result of a unique technological process (Steel&Color) allowing the fusion of steel with color . The collection was awarded by the famous prize Red Dot Design Award 2009.

See also

List of Italian companies

References

External links
 Official Lagostina website - Italy—
 Official website - USA— 
 Official website - France—
 Official website - Canada—

Cooking appliance brands
Design companies of Italy
Kitchenware brands
Italian brands
Manufacturing companies of Italy
Companies based in Omegna
Design companies established in 1901
Manufacturing companies established in 1901
Italian companies established in 1901
Cutlery brands